Grace Episcopal Church is a historic church at 614 E. Poplar Street in Wynne, Arkansas.  It is an architecturally eclectic single-story brick structure, built in 1917 for a newly formed congregation.  It was built in part with materials donated by the Missouri-Pacific Railroad, which was then on a major depot-building campaign.  The church is a distinctive regional example of an English country church, albeit with some Colonial Revival and Craftsman flourishes, and is relatively unaltered since its construction.

The building was listed on the National Register of Historic Places in 1992.

See also
National Register of Historic Places listings in Cross County, Arkansas

References

Episcopal church buildings in Arkansas
Churches on the National Register of Historic Places in Arkansas
Colonial Revival architecture in Arkansas
Buildings and structures in Cross County, Arkansas
National Register of Historic Places in Cross County, Arkansas